Pomacea reyrei is a South American species of freshwater snail with gills and an operculum, an aquatic gastropod mollusc in the family Ampullariidae, the apple snails.

Distribution
P. reyrei is endemic to Venezuela.

References

reyrei
Molluscs of South America
Invertebrates of Colombia
Freshwater snails
Gastropods described in 1887